The 2019 LPGA of Korea Tour was the 42nd season of the LPGA of Korea Tour, the professional golf tour for women operated by the Korea Ladies Professional Golf' Association. The season began at Twin Doves Golf Club in Vietnam in December 2018, and ended at Woojeong Hills Country Club in Cheonan.

Schedule
The number in parentheses after winners' names show the player's total number wins in official money individual events on the LPGA of Korea Tour, including that event.

Events in bold are majors.

References

External links
 

2019
2019 in women's golf
2019 in South Korean sport